Arthur Ledlie Wheeler  (May 12, 1872 – December 20, 1917) was an American college football player.  He was elected to the College Football Hall of Fame in 1969.

References

1872 births
1917 deaths
19th-century players of American football
All-American college football players
American football guards
College Football Hall of Fame inductees
Princeton Tigers football players